Smilegate is a South Korean video game developer and publisher, which develops, publishes and services mobile and PC online games.  It has five core business sectors: game development, publishing, platform, investment and social contribution. Established in Korea in 2002, it is the creator of Crossfire, an FPS game with over six million concurrent players across the globe, and many more distinguished titles.

They are also the creators of online anime gacha game Epic Seven.

History
Smilegate was selected as recipient of the Excellence Award, ETRI IDC in 2003. Smilegate began developing Online FPS Crossfire in 2006 and launched Crossfire in China and Japan the next year. In 2009 recorded 1 million peak concurrent users in China, and 0.1 million peak concurrent users in Vietnam. Over the following years Smilegate earned numerous awards.In 2014 Smilegate invested $112 million in casual gaming company SUNDAYTOZ. Smilegate Megaport launched Mobile Service Platform 'STOVE' in June 2015. Smilegate is teaming up with Hollywood production company 'Original Film' for the big screen adaptation of its mega-hit shooting game “Crossfire.” Smilegate Entertainment has signed a $500 million exclusive publishing agreement with Oriental Shiny Star for the upcoming “Crossfire 2” online shooting game in China.

In 2017, to serve Crossfire further in the European market, a new office was opened in Berlin, Germany. This office was closed in April 2018, as part of a company-wide restructuring process and all games operations were moved back to Smilegate West in Toronto.

In July 2021, Smilegate made an investment of $100 million into startup developer That's No Moon formed by veterans of Naughty Dog and Infinity Ward.

Games 
These are the games developed or published by Smilegate. Publisher and release dates are for South Korea unless otherwise noted.

References

External links 

Video game development companies
Video game publishers
Video game companies of South Korea
Video game companies established in 2002
South Korean companies established in 2002
Bundang